Tegremante (15?? – 1626) was the Kalinago chief on St Kitts when Thomas Warner arrived by 1623 to establish a colony. He was killed in his sleep during the Kalinago Genocide of 1626.

See also
History of Saint Kitts and Nevis

References

Saint Kitts and Nevis chiefs
Saint Kitts and Nevis murder victims
People murdered in Saint Kitts and Nevis
1620s deaths
Year of birth unknown
Kalinago